Matthias & Maxime is a 2019 Canadian drama film written and directed by Xavier Dolan. It stars Dolan, Gabriel D'Almeida Freitas, Pier-Luc Funk, Samuel Gauthier, Antoine Pilon, Adib Alkhalidey, Anne Dorval, Micheline Bernard, Marilyn Castonguay and Catherine Brunet.

It had its world premiere at the Cannes Film Festival on 22 May 2019. It was released on 9 October 2019 by Les Films Séville.

Plot
Matthias (Gabriel D'Almeida Freitas) and Maxime (Xavier Dolan) are two lifelong friends in their late twenties living in Montreal. The motivated but uptight Matthias is a successful business worker with an attractive and caring girlfriend, Sarah, while the quieter, gentler Maxime is a bartender who spends time taking care of his abusive, alcoholic mother. Matthias is primed for a promotion at his job while Maxime is preparing to move to Australia for work opportunities.

The two take a trip to the lakeside cabin of a wealthy friend, Rivette. Rivette's pushy sister, Erika, is a film student and pressures Matthias and Maxime to be in her student film, as her two actors have dropped out. Maxime capitulates and agrees to appear in the project, and Matthias is later forced to join after losing a bet to Rivette. They are upset to later learn that their participation will require them to kiss, but their friends remind them that they had kissed before, years ago in school, which Matthias claimed was the result of him being under the influence of party drugs. Nevertheless, they share an offscreen kiss for the film.

The kiss has a profound, distracting effect on Matthias, who cannot sleep the next morning and goes for a swim, accidentally ending up on the wrong side of the lake; later, he turns down a job promotion and argues with Sarah. He is further unnerved when Erika shows the completed film at a get-together thrown by her mother, though Sarah seems to understand his conflicted feelings. Meanwhile, Maxime turns over care of his mother's estate to his aunt and tries to get a letter of recommendation from Matthias's father, who is a successful businessman in Chicago. Both men are further confused by the kiss due to their understood interest in women, and Matthias is especially upset because of his relationship with Sarah.

Matthias tries to get out of attending Maxime's party, apparently in denial that he will actually leave for Australia, but Sarah pushes for him to go. He upsets their friends by arriving late, making a poor speech for Maxime, and initially turning down the invitation for an afterparty with the rest of their friends, before Sarah convinces him to attend. At the afterparty, he further antagonizes the group by starting an argument during a party game and getting into a fight, culminating in insulting Maxime's facial birthmark. Matthias leaves the party angrily before returning and apologizing. After the night is over, he and Maxime share a kiss and a brief sexual encounter; but Matthias breaks away, leaving Maxime hurt and confused.

Later, Matthias goes to a strip club with a business associate before abruptly leaving to run through the streets. Maxime cleans out his house in preparation for moving, having discovered a childhood drawing of himself and Matthias living on a farm together, which touches him. He finally gets a call back from the office of Matthias's father, as he had inquired after his missing letter of recommendation; the secretary informs him that it was actually sent to Matthias, who had failed to forward it to him. Maxime realizes Matthias's state of denial and has the letter forwarded to his email directly. Ready to leave, Maxime departs his home to meet a friend who will take him to the airport, and sees that Matthias is there waiting for him as well.

Cast
 Xavier Dolan as Maxime
 Gabriel D'Almeida Freitas as Matthias 
 Pier-Luc Funk as Rivette
 Antoine Pilon as Brass
 Samuel Gauthier as Frank
 Adib Alkhalidey as Shariff
 Catherine Brunet as Lisa
 Marilyn Castonguay as Sarah
 Micheline Bernard as Francine
 Anne Dorval as Manon
 Harris Dickinson as McAfee
 Camille Felton as Ericka

Production
In January 2018, it was announced that Dolan would write, direct, produce, and star in the film, alongside Anne Dorval. In August 2018, it was announced Pier-Luc Funk and Micheline Bernard joined the cast of the film. In September 2018, Gabriel D'Almeida Freitas, Antoine Pilon, Samuel Gauthier, Adib Alkhalidey, Catherine Brunet and Marilyn Castonguay joined the cast of the film.  In November 2018, Another Man magazine mentioned that Harris Dickinson had just finished filming with Dolan and would be co-starring in the film.

Principal photography began on August 15, 2018, in Quebec.

Music
Original soundtrack is composed by Jean-Michel Blais, a pianist and composer living in Montreal, Canada. His piano piece called "Solitude" was inspired, amongst other sources, by Franz Schubert's "Themes and Variations". Blais was honoured on May 25, 2019, with the Cannes Soundtrack Award for his work in the film.

Notable songs used include "Work B**ch by Britney Spears, "J'ai cherché" by Amir Haddad, "Always on My Mind" by Pet Shop Boys, "Stranger's Kiss" by Alex Cameron and Angel Olsen and "Song for Zula" by Phosphorescent.

Release
The film had its world premiere at the Cannes Film Festival on 22 May 2019. In May 2020, Mubi acquired distribution rights to the film in the U.S, U.K, Ireland, Australia, Latin America, and India. It was released on Mubi on 28 August 2020.

Reception
The site's critical consensus reads, "Matthias and Maxime enchants almost as much as it frustrates, although Xavier Dolan fans may appreciate seeing the writer-director working at a more restrained pitch." Metacritic gave the film a weighted average score of 60 out of 100, based on 18 critics, indicating "mixed or average reviews".

In December 2019, the film was named to TIFF's annual year-end Canada's Top Ten list. The film was nominated for seven awards at the 22nd Quebec Cinema Awards, including Best Supporting Actor for Funk and Best Editing for Dolan. It won for Best Supporting Actress for Bernard, Best Music for Jean-Michel Blais and Most Successful Film Outside Quebec.

The film was shortlisted for the Prix collégial du cinéma québécois in 2020.

References

External links
 
 Interview with Xavier Dolan on MUBI's YouTube channel

2010s Canadian films
2019 films
2019 drama films
2019 independent films
2019 LGBT-related films
Canadian drama films
Canadian independent films
Canadian LGBT-related films
English-language Canadian films
Bisexuality-related films
Gay-related films
LGBT-related drama films
Films directed by Xavier Dolan
French-language Canadian films